The 19th Annual Gotham Independent Film Awards, presented by the Independent Filmmaker Project, were held on November 30, 2009. The nominees were announced on October 19, 2009. The ceremony was hosted by Kumail Nanjiani.

Winners and nominees

Gotham Tributes
 Tim Bevan and Eric Fellner
 Kathryn Bigelow
 Natalie Portman
 Stanley Tucci

References

External links
 

2009 film awards
2009